The 1972 North Dakota Fighting Sioux football team, also known as the Nodaks, was an American football team that represented the University of North Dakota in the North Central Conference (NCC) during the 1972 NCAA College Division football season. In its fifth year under head coach Jerry Olson, the team compiled a 10–1 record (6–1 against NCC opponents), tied for the NCC championship, defeated Cal Poly in the Camellia Bowl, and outscored opponents by a total of 423 to 161. The team played its home games at Memorial Stadium in Grand Forks, North Dakota.

Schedule

References

North Dakota
North Dakota Fighting Hawks football seasons
North Central Conference football champion seasons
North Dakota Fighting Sioux football